Shaukat Ali Khan (9 February 1926 – 1 July 2006) was an Awami League politician in Pakistan, and later in Bangladesh. He was elected as the Member of Parliament (MP) from Mirzapur in 1970 and as the Jatiya Sangsad member from the Tangail-7 constituency from 1973 to 1975. He was awarded Independence Day Award by the Government of Bangladesh in 2019 posthumously.

Khan passed his matriculation from Rangoon University. He passed his I.Sc. from St. Xavier's College, Kolkata and bachelor's degree from Scottish Church College, Kolkata. He later earned his bar-at-law from Lincoln's Inn in London.

References

1926 births
2006 deaths
People from Tangail District
Bangladeshi barristers
Awami League politicians
Scottish Church College alumni
University of Calcutta alumni
University of Yangon alumni
Recipients of the Independence Day Award